Matthew Stephen Turner Hughes (born 17 April 1996) is an English cricketer. Playing for Oxford University, he scored a century in each of his first two first-class matches.

He now teaches Chemistry at Merchant Taylors' School, Northwood, whilst still coaching cricket.

Cricket career
Matthew Hughes attended Stockport Grammar School before going up to Hertford College, Oxford. On his first-class debut, in the annual match against Cambridge University in 2015, he opened the batting for Oxford University and top-scored in each innings, making 41 and 116 in a losing cause. In his next first-class match, the 2016 university match, he made 116 (the top score) and 76 batting at number three, and Oxford won. He also scored 132 not out in the 2018 50-over university match at Lord's to take Oxford to a five-wicket victory with 10 overs to spare.

Since 2018 he has taught Chemistry at Merchant Taylors' School, Northwood.

References

External links

1996 births
Living people
Cricketers from Manchester
English cricketers
Oxford University cricketers
People educated at Stockport Grammar School
Alumni of Hertford College, Oxford